Donald Grantham (born November 9, 1947) is an American composer and music educator.

Grantham was born in Duncan, Oklahoma. After receiving a Bachelor of Music from the University of Oklahoma, he went on to receive his MM and DMA from the University of Southern California. For two summers he studied under famed French composer and pedagogue, Nadia Boulanger at the American Conservatory in France. His music has won many prestigious awards, including the Prix Lili Boulanger, the ASCAP Rudolf Nissim Prize, and First Prize in the National Opera Association's Biennial Composition Competition. Grantham is the recipient of a Guggenheim Fellowship and three separate grants from the National Endowment for the Arts. The symphony orchestras of Atlanta, Cleveland, and Dallas are among the ensembles that have commissioned Grantham to write new works. Grantham also collaborated with fellow composer Kent Kennan to author the textbook The Technique of Orchestration.

Grantham currently teaches music composition at the University of Texas at Austin Butler School of Music, where he is the Frank C. Erwin, Jr. Centennial Professor of Music.

Well-known pieces include Southern Harmony and Kentucky Harmony for band.
His most famous piece is the Baron Cimetiere's Mambo.

References
 Biography on Naxos website
 Profile on Sigma Alpha Iota website
 "Donald Grantham" The Alcalde 74, 1, Mar–Apr 1983, p. 10, Emmis Communications

External links
 
 "Donald Grantham, Professor of Composition" – Profile on Butler School of Music website
 Interview with Donald Grantham, November 16, 1991

1947 births
21st-century American composers
20th-century classical composers
21st-century classical composers
American male classical composers
Living people
Distinguished Service to Music Medal recipients
Texas classical music
USC Thornton School of Music alumni
University of Oklahoma alumni
University of Texas at Austin faculty
American classical composers
20th-century American composers
20th-century American male musicians
21st-century American male musicians